Arístides Royo Sánchez (born 14 August 1940) is a Panamanian politician who was President of Panama from 11 October 1978 to 31 July 1982, when he was pressured to resign by the military. He is currently the Minister of Canal Affairs.

Biography
He studied law at the University of Salamanca in Spain, returning to Panama in 1965. In 1960, Royo met his future wife, a Spanish citizen named Adela María Ruiz González, while both were students in Salamanca. They married in the early 1960s and had three children - Marta Elena, Irma Natalia, and Aristides José.

During the military dictatorship, he served as Education Minister from 1973 to 1974 and helped negotiate the Torrijos–Carter Treaties in 1977.

Following his presidency, he was appointed Ambassador to Spain (1994–1996) and France (1998–1999).

Presidents and heads of state of Panama from 1968 to 1989 were mainly appointed by either General Omar Torrijos or General Manuel Noriega, who were the two powerful strongmen during that period. President Jimmy Carter negotiated the Panama Canal treaties with General Torrijos in 1978, which were opposed by the then-presidential candidate Ronald Reagan. Eleven years later, President George H. W. Bush launched the Invasion of Panama to remove General Manuel Noriega from power.

However, Royo did get some political power in the timeframe between Torrijos's death in July 1981 and the military takeover by Rubén Darío Paredes in March 1982.

He is currently the minister of affairs related to the Panama Canal; the current administrator of the Panama Canal is Ricaurte Vasquez Morales.

Royo's wife, former First Lady Adela Ruiz de Royo, died on 19 June 2019. In December 2019, Royo's daughter, Natalia Royo de Hagerman, was appointed as Panama's ambassador to the United Kingdom.

References

1940 births
Living people
People from La Chorrera District
Presidents of Panama
Ambassadors of Panama to Spain
Ambassadors of Panama to France
University of Salamanca alumni
Education ministers of Panama